An Engineer Combat Battalion (ECB) was a designation for a battalion-strength combat engineer unit in the U.S. Army, most prevalent during World War II.  They are a component of the United States Army Corps of Engineers.

Also known as "Combat Engineer Battalions", they were typically divided into four companies: A, B, C, and Headquarters and Service (H&S).

Best known for pontoon bridge construction and clearing hazards in amphibious landings, their duties also included serving as sappers deploying and deactivating explosive charges and unexploded munitions, mapmaking, camouflage, and a wide variety of construction services supporting frontline troops.  They also fielded defensive .30 cal. and .50 cal. machine gun squads, anti-tank rocket and grenade launchers, and were required to fight as infantry as a secondary mission.

Combat engineers played important roles in numerous World War II battles, especially breaching the heavily fortified Siegfried Line protecting the German border and numerous defensive lines established by the Wehrmacht in Italy, including the Gustav Line. Among the most familiar for their heroism and contributions to establishing key bridgeheads in Europe was at the Ludendorff Bridge at the Battle of Remagen.

Combat engineers also played roles in several unconventional operations, including the securing of elements of the German nuclear weapons program in Operation Big and recovery of stolen art and treasure subsequently returned to its original owners by the Monuments Men.

In the Pacific Theater, the U.S. Army's 42nd Combat Engineers took part in the hard-fought high casualty Battle of Attu Aleutian Islands (1943) and the Battle of Manila, Luzon Philippines (1945), earning 2 Battle Stars.

In the early morning of 29 May 1943, the 50th Combat Engineers were the first U S Army unit encountered by the last Japanese troops on the island, making a suicide charge toward artillery atop Engineer Hill. 50th Engineers fought back immediately and kept fighting while nearby combat units arrived.

Capabilities

A World War II era combat engineer battalion possessed both combat and combat support capabilities.  These included, but were not limited to: 
Bridge (mobile, floating, fixed), rail, & road construction and maintenance
Conducting river crossings by pontoon/raft, motor-powered assault boats
Demolition
Placing/de-arming munitions, including mines
Port & harbor maintenance and rehabilitation, including beachheads:
Laying roads and unloading/loading supplies, vehicles & personnel from transport and cargo ships
Camouflage 
Water supply and sanitation
Map production
Vehicle maintenance
Establishing/maintaining supply and ammunition dumps
Building barracks, depots, and similar structures
Rescue & road patrols, bridge and road reconnaissance
Clearing of debris and wreckage
Unit defense and intelligence
Fighting as infantry when needed

US units

Combat Engineer Battalions in the U.S. military include:

1st Engineer Combat Battalion
2nd Engineer Combat Battalion
5th Engineer Battalion
9th Engineer Combat Battaltion
14th Engineer Combat Battalion
15th Engineer Battalion
16th Engineer Battalion
19th Combat Engineer Battalion
20th Engineer Battalion
31st Engineer Combat Battalion
41st Engineer Battalion
42nd Engineer Combat Battalion
 50th Engineer Combat Battalion
65th Engineer Battalion
 82nd Engineer Combat Battalion
114th Engineer Combat Battalion
 135th Engineer Combat Battalion
206th Engineer Combat Battalion
207th Engineer Combat Battalion 
237th Engineer Combat Battalion
238th Engineer Combat Battalion
244th Combat Engineers
246th Engineer Combat Battalion (WW II)
248th Engineer Combat Battalion
249th Engineer Combat Battalion
250th Engineer Combat Battalion (WW II)
254th Engineer Combat Battalion
257th Engineer Combat Battalion (WW II)
258th Engineer Combat Battalion
283rd Engineer Combat Battalion
289th Engineer Combat Battalion
291st Engineer Combat Battalion
296th Engineer Combat Battalion
298th Engineer Combat Battalion
297th Engineer Combat Battalion
299th Engineer Combat Battalion
311th Engineer Combat Battalion, 8th Blackhawk Division, European Theater
402nd Engineer Battalion
554th Engineer Battalion
864th Engineer Battalion
876th Engineer Battalion
1255th Engineer Combat Battalion 
1263rd Engineer Combat Battalion
1269th Engineer Combat Battalion
1288th Engineer Combat Battalion
1695th Engineer Combat Battalion

See also

Bailey bridge
1st Combat Engineer Battalion (United States Marine Corps)

References

External links
U.S. Army Corps of Engineers
82nd Engineer Combat Battalion
299th Engineer Combat Battalion
IV Corps Combat Engineers

Engineer battalions of the United States Army